is a Japanese actor, voice actor and narrator from Chiba Prefecture, Japan. He is currently affiliated with Umikaze, though he has been attached to Arts Vision, Aksent, Ken Production, and Art 7 in the past.

Biography

Filmography

Television animation
1977
Ore wa Teppei
Ippatsu Kanta-kun (Hisashi Gohigō)

1983
Captain Tsubasa (Genzō Wakabayashi)
Aura Battler Dunbine (Fei Chenka)

1984
Katri, Girl of the Meadows (Biriyami)

1985
Blue Comet SPT Layzner (Bohn, Derol)

1986
The Wonderful Wizard of Oz
Ginga: Nagareboshi Gin (Wilson)
Saint Seiya (Cygnus Hyōga)
High School! Kimengumi (Kyūma Taku)

1987
City Hunter (Announcer)
Mister Ajikko (Akihiko)

1988
Tatakae!! Ramenman (Cheng)
Hello! Lady Lynn (Gym)

1989
Kimba the White Lion (Zoo Announcer)

1994
Mobile Fighter G Gundam (Wong Yunfat)
Sailor Moon S (Kakusui Yakushiji)

1996
Rurouni Kenshin (Kanekura)

1998
Silent Möbius (Robert De Vice)
Detective Conan (Junko's father (Yoshiaki Hara))

2000
One Piece (Captain Kuro, Sai)

2004
Beet the Vandel Buster (Barasa)

Unknown date
Aoki Densetsu Shoot! (Naoshige Serizawa)
Future GPX Cyber Formula (Announcer)
The Super Dimension Century Orguss (Slay)
Tales of Eternia (Tasuteku Burukāno)
Machine Robo: Revenge of Cronos (Rod Drill)
Magical Tarurūto-kun (Ashita Banryū)

OVA
Captain Tsubasa: Holland Youth (xxxx) (Genzō Wakabayashi)
Legend of the Galactic Heroes (xxxx) (Gunter Kesselring)
Saint Seiya (xxxx) (Cygnus Hyōga)
Megazone 23 (xxxx) (Nakao)
Mobile Suit Gundam 0083: Stardust Memory (1991) (Bicok)

Theatrical animation
Captain Tsubasa series (xxxx) (Genzō Wakabayashi)
Silent Möbius 2 (1992) (Robert De Vice)
Saint Seiya series (xxxx) (Cygnus Hyōga)
Space Runaway Ideon ((xxxx) Marusu Bento)
Doraemon: Nobita's Monstrous Underwater Castle (1983) (Ocean Dweller)
The Plot of the Fuma Clan (xxxx) (Fuma B)
Doraemon: Nobita and the Birth of Japan (1989) (Future Time Patroller)

Video games
Captain Tsubasa 5: Hasha no Shogo Campione (xxxx) (Alcion, Genzo Wakabayashi)
Saint Seiya: Sanctuary Jūnikyū Hen (2005) (Cygnus Hyōga)

Drama CDs
Koei CD Drama Collections Sangokushi Daiichibu (xxxx) (Tomosaki Nagano)

Radio dramas
Star Wars (xxxx) (C-3PO)

External links

1953 births
Living people
Male voice actors from Chiba Prefecture
Japanese male video game actors
Japanese male voice actors
Senshu University alumni
20th-century Japanese male actors
21st-century Japanese male actors
Arts Vision voice actors
Ken Production voice actors
Japanese tenors